Jaulín is a municipality located in the province of Zaragoza, Aragon, Spain. According to the 2004 census (INE), the municipality has a population of 307 inhabitants.

Points of interest 
 Gamesa G128-4.5 MW wind turbine

References

Municipalities in the Province of Zaragoza